An alpha nuclide is a nuclide that consists of an integer number of alpha particles.  Alpha nuclides have equal, even numbers of protons and neutrons; they are important in stellar nucleosynthesis since the energetic environment within stars is amenable to fusion of alpha particles into heavier nuclei. Stable alpha nuclides, and stable decay products of radioactive alpha nuclides, are some of the most common metals in the universe.

Alpha nuclide is also shorthand for alpha radionuclide, referring to those radioactive isotopes that undergo alpha decay and thereby emit alpha particles.

List of alpha nuclides

The nuclear binding energy of alpha nuclides heavier than zinc-60 (beginning with germanium-64) is too large for them be formed by fusion processes (see alpha process). , the heaviest known alpha nuclide is xenon-108.

References 

Nuclear physics